is a former Japanese football player He is the currently assistant manager of J2 League club Ventforet Kofu.

Club career
Otsuka was born in Chiba Prefecture on December 29, 1975. After graduating from high school, he joined his local club JEF United Ichihara in 1994. However he could hardly play in the match and he moved to Japan Football League club Kawasaki Frontale in 1997. He played many matches as defensive midfielder. The club was also promoted to J2 League in 1999 and J1 League in 2000. He moved to Omiya Ardija in 2001. Although he played as regular player in 2001, his opportunity to play decreased from 2002. He moved to Montedio Yamagata in 2004 and Consadole Sapporo in 2006. He played as regular player at both clubs until 2007. However he got hurt in October 2007. He could hardly play in the match in 2008 and retired end of 2008 season.

National team career
In April 1995, Otsuka was selected Japan U-20 national team for 1995 World Youth Championship. But he did not play in the match.

Club statistics

References

External links

1975 births
Living people
Association football people from Chiba Prefecture
Japanese footballers
J1 League players
J2 League players
Japan Football League (1992–1998) players
JEF United Chiba players
Kawasaki Frontale players
Omiya Ardija players
Montedio Yamagata players
Hokkaido Consadole Sapporo players
Association football midfielders